Townships are the third-level administrative subdivisions of counties of the Republic of China (Taiwan), along with county-administered cities. After World War II, the townships were established from the following conversions on the Japanese administrative divisions:

Although local laws do not enforce strict standards for classifying them, generally urban townships have a larger population and more business and industry than rural townships, but not to the extent of county-administered cities. Under townships, there is still the village as the fourth or basic level of administration. 

As of 2022, there are totally 184 townships, including 38 urban townships, 122 rural townships and 24 mountain indigenous townships. 174 townships with 35 urban and 118 rural townships are located in Taiwan Province and 10 townships with 3 urban and 4 rural townships are located in Fujian Province. Penghu and Lienchiang are the only two counties that do not have urban townships.

Statistics of townships

Taiwan Province

Fujian Province

List of townships by county

Township names are now transliterated using the Hanyu Pinyin romanization system without tone marks. Note that the county names do not necessarily use Hanyu Pinyin or special case such as Lukang.

Colors indicate the common language status of Formosan languages, Hakka or Matsu dialect within each division.

See also
 County (Taiwan)
 County-administered city

References

 Township
Populated places in Taiwan